George Campbell Cooke (17 March 1906 – 23 May 1941) was a New Zealand rower who competed in the 1932 Summer Olympics. He was a member of the New Zealand boat which was eliminated in the repêchage of the eight competition.

Cooke was born in Blenheim. He was killed in action during World War II at Servia, Greece. He was a Corporal in the New Zealand Army, and died of wounds during the Allied retreat in the Greek campaign of 1941.

References 

1906 births
1941 deaths
New Zealand male rowers
Olympic rowers of New Zealand
Rowers at the 1932 Summer Olympics
New Zealand Army personnel
New Zealand military personnel killed in World War II